Noa was an Australian zeuhl group. The band claims influences from the progressive rock bands Henry Cow and Art Zoyd.

The group's lineup was Philipe Vincendeuu on saxophones, Christian Robard on drums, vibraphone and xylophone, Bernard Nicolas on flute and soprano saxophone, Alain Gaubert on guitar and bass, and Claudei Nicolas on vocals.

In 2015, the band's only album, Noa, was re-released by the label Soleil Zeuhl.

References

External links
Noa's profile at SoleilZeuhl's website.

French progressive rock groups
Zeuhl
Musical groups from Pays de la Loire